Calvary Hospital is an American non-profit institution specializing in hospice and palliative care, headquartered in the Bronx, a borough of New York City, New York. The hospital has a total of 225 beds.

History
Calvary Hospital was founded in 1899 and is operated in connection with the Roman Catholic Archdiocese of New York. The hospital was one of the first, and is still one of the largest, medical complexes focusing on end-of-life hospice care.

In addition to its main facility in the Morris Park, Bronx it has had a 25-bed facility within the Lutheran Medical Center in Sunset Park, Brooklyn since 2001.  It also has various outreach programs.

Calvary Hospital operates a third location, the Dawn Greene Hospice, a 10-bed facility located on the 15th Floor of Mary Manning Walsh Home (MMW) on the Upper East Side of Manhattan.

Deaths of notable people
 Ronald Alexander (playwright) (1917–1995), playwright
 Alan Betrock (1950-2000),  music critic and publisher
 Chad Brown (1961-2014), poker player
 Thomas A. Duffy (1906–1979), judge, lawyer, and politician
 Xavier Gonzalez (1898–1993), artist
 Larry Harlow (1939-2021), salsa music performer, composer, and producer
 Robert Hughes (1938-2012),  art critic, writer, and television producer
 Randy Jones (1944-2016), jazz musician (drummer)
 Lewis H. Michaux (1885-1976), bookseller and civil rights activist
 Andrew P. O'Rourke (1933-2013), 
 Stay High 149 (Wayne Roberts) (1950 - 2012),  graffiti artist
 Soupy Sales (1926-2009),  actor, comedian
 Richard Tee (1943–1993), pianist, studio musician, singer and arranger
 Yomo Toro (1933–2012), musician
 Guy J. Velella (1944-2011),  New York State Senator

See also

 List of hospitals in the Bronx

References

Companies based in the Bronx
Hospices in the United States
Catholic hospitals in North America
Hospitals established in 1899
Hospitals in the Bronx
Roman Catholic Archdiocese of New York
Morris Park, Bronx